Griffiniana duplessisae, or Duplessis' agile katydid, is a species of katydid in the subfamily Phaneropterinae. It is endemic to Cederberg Mountains in South Africa.

References

Mecopodinae
Insects described in 2012
Endemic insects of South Africa